Bo Nagar is a Burmese revolutionary and the commander of the Myanmar Royal Dragon Army (MRDA). He is a leading figure of the Myanmar's Spring Revolution and People's Defensive War. He has commanded the Pale People's Defense Force, which has been inflicting casualties on military troops in 2021. Amid rising resistance in Sagaing Region, he has risen in prominence and the junta has attempted to capture him. He has commanded the MRDA, which is under the NUG's command, since its formation in January, 2022. Under his leadership, 180 soldiers have killed in ambushes. As retaliation, the military troops raided a village for searching Bo Nagar, killed 20 people, and his cousin was beheaded. In January 2022, the military council used four helicopters to capture Bo Nagar, but did not succeed.

References

Living people
People from Sagaing Region
Burmese revolutionaries
Year of birth missing (living people)